The 1981 Cincinnati Bearcats football team represented University of Cincinnati during 1981 NCAA Division I-A football season.

Schedule

References

Cincinnati
Cincinnati Bearcats football seasons
Cincinnati Bearcats football